The 2017 Giro dell'Emilia was the 100th edition of the Giro dell'Emilia road cycling one day race. It was held on 30 September 2017 as part of the 2017 UCI Europe Tour in category 1.HC, over a distance of 223.3 km, starting in Bologna and ending in Madonna di San Luca, Bologna.

Teams
Twenty-four teams were invited to take part in the race. These included eleven UCI WorldTeams, nine UCI Professional Continental teams and four UCI Continental teams.

Results

References 

Giro dell'Emilia
Giro dell'Emilia
Giro dell'Emilia